The National Explosives Detection Canine Team Program is a program administered by the Transportation Security Administration which uses law enforcement and TSA-run explosives detection dog teams to detect explosives in transportation environments.

History
The program was originally started in 1972 by the TSA's predecessor, the Federal Aviation Administration, who at the time, was responsible for aviation security in the United States. The program paired airport-based law enforcement officers with conventional explosive detection canines to detect explosives in objects such as vehicles and baggage.

Following the September 11th attacks, which resulted in the creation of TSA, the NEDCTP was transferred from the FAA to TSA and was completed by March 2003. In the following years, TSA expanded the LEO teams to other modes of transportation, such as mass transit. In January 2008, TSA began deploying their own unarmed teams where regulatory transportation security inspectors (TSIs) were paired with a canine to screen air cargo. In 2011, TSA furthered the program by launching passenger screening canine (PSC) teams, which are explosive detection canines who besides detecting explosives in objects, can also detect explosives hidden on a person.

Canines and training 
TSA sources their canines from the Department of Defense Military Working Dog program. The canines are trained at TSA's Canine Training Center, located at Lackland Air Force Base in San Antonio, Texas, also home to DOD's Military Working Dog program.

TSA uses the following breeds of canine for explosive detection work:
Belgian Malinois
German Shepherd
German Shorthaired Pointer
German Wirehaired Pointer 
Golden Retriever
Labrador Retriever
Vizsla

There are two types of explosive detection canines trained by TSA:
Conventional explosive detection canines (EDC) who undergo a 10-week training course accompanied by either an assigned LEO or TSA handler. EDCs are trained to recognize explosive odors coming from baggage and vehicles.
Passenger screening canines (PSC) who undergo a 12-week training course accompanied by their TSA handler. PSCs are trained to recognize explosive odors on passengers plus odors from objects as an EDC does.

TSA operates 372 canine teams consisting of a Transportation Security Specialist - Explosive Detection Canine Handler (TSS-EDCH) and a canine. Prior to 2017, the handler was classified as a Transportation Security Inspector - EDCH. The remaining 675 NEDCTP teams are made up of state and local law enforcement handlers.

References

Transportation Security Administration
Transportation in the United States
United States Department of Homeland Security agencies
1972 establishments in the United States
Aftermath of the September 11 attacks
Detection dogs
Dog training and behavior
Explosive detection